KUSB (103.3 FM), known as "103.3 US Country", is a radio station located in Bismarck, North Dakota, owned by Townsquare Media that signed on September 25, 2006 with a country music format, directly competing with Clear Channel Communications' KQDY 94.5 and Radio Bismarck-Mandan's KKBO "105.9 The Big Rig".

Townsquare Media also owns KLXX 1270 (Talk), KACL 98.7 (Oldies) KBYZ 96.5 (Classic rock), and KKCT 97.5 (Top 40) in the Bismarck-Mandan area. All the studios are at 4303 Memorial Highway in Mandan, along with the AM transmitter and tower. All the FM transmitters are at a site in Saint Anthony, North Dakota, on 57th Road.

External links
103.3 US Country official website

USB
Country radio stations in the United States
Radio stations established in 2006
Townsquare Media radio stations